Usady is a rural locality (a village) in Styopantsevskoye Rural Settlement, Vyaznikovsky District, Vladimir Oblast, Russia. The population was 195 as of 2010. There is 1 street.

Geography 
Usady is located 50 km southwest of Vyazniki (the district's administrative centre) by road. Butorlino is the nearest rural locality.

References 

Rural localities in Vyaznikovsky District